Marios Kaperonis (born 17 February 1983) is Greek former amateur boxer. He lost in the first round of 2004 Summer Olympics in the men's lightweight division (– 60 kg) to eventual silver medalist Amir Khan from Great Britain.

External links
sports-reference

1983 births
Living people
Olympic boxers of Greece
Boxers at the 2004 Summer Olympics
Greek male boxers
Lightweight boxers
Sportspeople from Patras
21st-century Greek people